Haigler Creek is located in the Mogollon Rim area of the state of Arizona. The facilities are maintained by Tonto National Forest division of the USDA Forest Service.

Fish species
Rainbow trout
Brown trout

References

External links
Arizona Fishing Locations Map
Arizona Boating Locations Facilities Map

Rivers of the Mogollon Rim
Rivers of Arizona
Rivers of Gila County, Arizona